Dolgans (Dolgan: ,   ,  (Sakha);) are an ethnic group who mostly inhabit Krasnoyarsk Krai, Russia. They are descended from several groups, particularly Evenks, one of the indigenous peoples of the Russian North. They adopted a Turkic language sometime after the 18th century. The 2010 Census counted 7,885 Dolgans. This number includes 5,517 in former Taymyr Autonomous Okrug.

Dolgans speak the Dolgan language, which is closely related to the Yakut language.

History 
In the 17th century, the Dolgans lived in the basins of the Olenyok River and Lena River. They moved to their current location, Taymyr, in the 18th century. The Dolgan identity began to emerge during the 19th and early 20th centuries, under the influence of three groups who migrated to the Krasnoyarsk area from the Lena River and Olenyok River region: Evenks, Yakuts, Enets, and so-called tundra peasants.

Culture and livelihood 
Originally, the Dolgans were nomadic hunters and reindeer herders. However, they were prevented from following a nomadic lifestyle during the Soviet era and required to form kolkhozy (rural collectives) that – in addition to their traditional activities – engaged in reindeer breeding, fishing, dairy farming and market gardening. In 1983, the anthropologist Shirin Akiner claimed: "Dolgans enjoy full Soviet citizenship. They are found in all occupations, though the majority are peasants and collective farm workers. Their standard of housing is comparable to that of other national groups in the Soviet Union."

Religion
Most Dolgans practise old shamanistic beliefs; however, most are influenced by Eastern Orthodox Christianity.

Notable Dolgans
Ogdo Aksyonova – a poet, the founder of Dolgan literature

See also
 Dolgan language

References

 
Ethnic groups in Russia
Turkic peoples of Asia
Indigenous peoples of North Asia
Indigenous small-numbered peoples of the North, Siberia and the Far East
Modern nomads